The Voice of Dust and Ash is a feature length documentary by first time Iranian-American director Mandana Biscotti, about Maestro Mohammad-Reza Shajarian. The film gives a first hand chronological account of Shajarian's life, through the animated prism of the unofficial national anthem for Iranian freedom,  Morq-e Sahar.

The film was nominated for two Hollywood Music and Media Awards in the category of  Best Music Documentary and Best Song. On December 17th, 2022 it was announced that the song "Dust and Ash" was shortlisted for the Academy Awards.

References 

2022 documentary films